The 2000 RTHK Top 10 Gold Songs Awards was held in 2000 for the 1999 music season.

Top 10 song awards
The top 10 songs (十大中文金曲) of 2000 are as follows.

Other awards
The top 10 outstanding artist was also extended to 11 artists.

References
 RTHK top 10 gold song awards 2000

RTHK Top 10 Gold Songs Awards
Rthk Top 10 Gold Songs Awards, 2000
Rthk Top 10 Gold Songs Awards, 2000